Biryakovo is a rural locality (a selo) and the administrative center of Biryakovskoye Rural Settlement, Sokolsky District, Vologda Oblast, Russia. The population was 799 as of 2002. There are 8 streets.

Geography 
Biryakovo is located 102 km northeast of Sokol (the district's administrative centre) by road. Gorka is the nearest rural locality.

References 

Rural localities in Sokolsky District, Vologda Oblast
Totemsky Uyezd